In the United States, a separate legal entity (SLE) refers to a type of legal entity with detached accountability. Any company is set up as an SLE to legally separate it from the individual or owner, such as a limited liability company or a corporation.

If a business is a separate legal entity, it means it has some of the same rights in law as a person. It is, for example, able to enter contracts, sue and be sued, and own property. A sole trader or partnership does not have a separate legal entity.

References

See also
 Types of business entity

Legal entities